Clavus cantharis is a species of sea snail, a marine gastropod mollusk in the family Drilliidae.

Description
The shell grows to a length of 11 mm. The smooth, obtusely ovate shell is thick and solid. Its color is very dark brown, the nodules are whitish. The whorls are oblique and nodosely plicated round the middle. The anal sinus is rather large.

Distribution
This marine species occurs in the Indo-Pacific Region, off the Philippines.

References

 Reeve, L.A. 1845. Monograph of the genus Pleurotoma. pls 20–33 in Reeve, L.A. (ed). Conchologia Iconica. London : L. Reeve & Co. Vol. 1.

External links
 

cantharis
Gastropods described in 1845